José "Pepe" Pinto Rosas (born 11 November 1929) is a Spanish retired footballer who played as a defender, and a current coach.

References

External links
 
 

1929 births
Living people
People from Antequera
Sportspeople from the Province of Málaga
Spanish footballers
Footballers from Andalusia
Association football defenders
La Liga players
Segunda División players
Tercera División players
Girona FC players
CD Condal players
FC Barcelona players
Real Valladolid players
Spanish football managers
Segunda División B managers
Tercera División managers
CE Manresa managers
Girona FC managers
UE Olot managers
UE Figueres managers
UE Costa Brava managers